Narasimha Nandi (born Narasimha Reddy) is an Indian film, screenwriter, director, producer and playwright known for his works predominantly in Telugu cinema. In 2008, he garnered the National Film Award and Nandi Award for directing 1940 Lo Oka Gramam. In 2013, he served in the Jury for South Region-2 at the 60th National Film Awards

Filmography

Awards
National Film Awards
National Film Award for Best Feature Film in Telugu (director) - 1940 Lo Oka Gramam (2008)

Nandi Awards
Sarojini Devi Award for a Film on National Integration (director) - 1940 Lo Oka Gramam (2008)

References

External links
 

Telugu film directors
Telugu film producers
Film producers from Andhra Pradesh
Nandi Award winners
Living people
Film directors from Andhra Pradesh
21st-century Indian film directors
Screenwriters from Andhra Pradesh
Year of birth missing (living people)